Alvimedica is a manufacturer of coronary stents, balloon catheters, diagnostic and guiding catheters. The company was founded in 2007 by Turkish businessmen and scientists living in Denmark and Sweden. The major intention of the company is investing in small and medium size medical device manufacturers to enable them to compete globally. The company made its first investment move by purchasing a medical device company called Nemed in Turkey in 2007. Following this, the company purchased an American company called In-Vivo, a manufacturer of angioplasty and angiography catheters, and one of the suppliers of Abbott Laboratories.

Alvimedica has one of the biggest Class 10.000 cleanrooms of Europe. An area of 700 m² - which also complies with GMP (Good Manufacturing Practice)'s standards - contains the main assembly of catheter and stent systems, including the first drug-eluting stent developed and manufactured in Turkey: Coracto. While Prof. Nicolaus Reifart of the Main-Taunus-Privatklinik in Germany performed the clinical studies, CVPath's well-known Cardiac Pathologist Prof. Renu Virmani conducted animal studies on Coracto SDS (Stent Delivery System) and announced the results at EuroPCR 2009. The study conducted by Dr. Virmani used confocal, scanning electron and light microscopy to examine reendothelialization and inflammation at 14 and 28 days of Coracto, a rapamycin-eluting stent, versus, a sirolimus-eluting stent (SES) and an everolimus-eluting stent (EES) and a bare metal stent (Constant) as a control in a healthy rabbit iliac model. The trial was not powered for significance, but results show that endothelial coverage of Coracto at 14 days was better than that of both EES and SES. As expected, the bare metal stent showed greatest endothelial coverage.

Alvimedica also develops projects in collaboration with universities in Turkey such as Boğaziçi University, Istanbul University, Sabancı University, Bilkent University, Yıldız Technical University, Yeditepe University, and international universities like Drexel University (USA), Medical University of Vienna (Austria), and as well as institutions like TASSA (Turkish American Scientists and Scholars Association), CVPath International Registry of Pathology (USA), or the Main-Taunus-Private Clinic (Germany). Alvimedica works with Stent for Life  to provide staff training.

In collaboration with TSC (Turkish Society of Cardiology), the company established Turkey's first cardiology simulation center. Together they provide training for Turkish cardiologists as part of an international project called Stent For Life. Through the training sessions the partnership aims at the early detecting of heart attacks and then making sure that the patient will receive the necessary treatment within an hour.

Alvimedica’s  headquarters are a 5.500 m² facility located at the free trade zone in Catalca, Istanbul, Turkey. Current projects include amongst others renal and cranial intravascular stents. The company is also working on bio-degradable stents which completely dissolve in the vessel.

Alvimedica sponsored a team for the 2014–2015 Volvo Ocean Race, round-the-world sailing race.

References

External links
 Alvimedica APS, website
 Sabanci University's Students Visited Alvimedica's HQs
 Alvimedica Has Europe’s largest 10,000 Class Cleanroom
 Turkish success in stents features in Sweden’s most important business newspaper.
 Frizon föder ett helt nytt Turkiet

Manufacturing companies based in Istanbul
Turkish companies established in 2007
Health care companies of Turkey
2007 establishments in Turkey
Turkish brands